Reaching Out may refer to:

Music
 Reaching Out (Dave Bailey album) or the title song, 1961
 Reaching Out (Menudo album), 1984
 "Reaching Out" (Nero song), 2011
 "Reaching Out" (Queen + Paul Rodgers song), 2005, originally by Rock Therapy
 "Reaching Out", a song by the Bee Gees from Spirits Having Flown, 1979
 "Reaching Out", a song by Kate Bush from The Sensual World, 1989
 "Reaching Out", a song by Snot from Strait Up, 2000

Other uses
 Reaching Out (sculpture), a 2020 work by Thomas J. Price on Greenwich Meridian Line, London
 Reaching Out (TV series), a 2001 Hong Kong drama series
 "Reaching Out" (The Colbys), a 1986 television episode
 Reaching Out MBA, an American nonprofit organization aiding LGBT+ MBA students and graduates
 Reaching Out Romania, a non-governmental organization helping girls to leave the sex industry

See also
 Reach Out (disambiguation)